Mehdi Pascal Marcel Léris (born 23 May 1998) is an Algerian professional footballer who plays as a winger for Serie A club Sampdoria and the Algeria national team.

Club career
Léris caught the eye of A.C. ChievoVerona in an amateur showcase tournament in Paris in 2013, and thereafter joined the youth academy of the team. Léris moved on loan to Juventus F.C. with an option to buy for a year, becoming a part of the youth squad without making an appearance for the senior team. Léris returned to Chievo, and made his professional debut with them in a 3–0 Serie A loss to Juventus FC on 9 September 2017.

On 12 August 2019, Léris signed a five-year deal with Sampdoria.

On 18 August 2021, he joined Brescia on a season-long loan with an option to buy.

International career
Leris was called up to the Algeria national team for a set of friendlies in November 2022. He debuted with them in a 1–1 friendly tie with Mali on 16 November 2022.

Personal life
Léris was born in France to a Spanish father and Algerian mother. Léris' father, Yannick, is a former amateur footballer and a U16 football coach in France.

Career statistics

Club

References

External links
 
 
 

Living people
1998 births
People from Mont-de-Marsan
Algeria international footballers
Algerian footballers
French footballers
Algerian people of Spanish descent
French sportspeople of Algerian descent
French people of Spanish descent
Association football wingers
A.C. ChievoVerona players
U.C. Sampdoria players
Brescia Calcio players
Serie A players
Serie B players
Algerian expatriate footballers
Algerian expatriate sportspeople in Italy
French expatriate footballers
French expatriate sportspeople in Italy
Expatriate footballers in Italy